Marie Amelie Lam Po Tang (born 1927) was a politician, diplomat, and business executive based in Mauritius. She was a member of the Legislative Yuan in Republic of China (Taiwan) from 1981 to 1984, then served as Mauritian ambassador to the People's Republic of China between 2000 and 2002.

Career
Born in 1927, Marie Amelie Lam Po Tang graduated from National Taiwan University where she studied foreign languages and literature. In Mauritius, Lam Po Tang led an overseas Chinese association, and the alumni association of the Chung-Hwa Middle School. Lam Po Tang's business interests included, a clothing factory, an investment firm, and a transportation company. She served a single term on the Taiwan-based Legislative Yuan from 1981 to 1984, representing overseas Chinese. She began serving as the Mauritian ambassador to the People's Republic of China, from 30 March 2000, and formally presented diplomatic credentials to Chinese Communist Party general secretary Jiang Zemin on 12 June 2000. She was married to Lim Kwat Chow Lam Po Tang, who succeeded her as ambassador.

References

1927 births
Year of death missing
20th-century Taiwanese women politicians
National Taiwan University alumni
Taiwanese emigrants to Mauritius
Mauritian women diplomats
Ambassadors of Mauritius to China
Members of the 1st Legislative Yuan in Taiwan
21st-century diplomats
Mauritian women in business
Women business executives
Taiwanese women in business
Taiwanese business executives
20th-century Taiwanese businesspeople
Women ambassadors